The Giara horse (Sardinian: Cuaddeddu de sa Jara) is a horse breed native to the island of Sardinia. It is one of the fifteen indigenous horse "breeds of limited distribution" recognised by the AIA, the Italian breeders' association. While of small size due to the hostile environment in which it lives, and sometimes called a "pony," it is considered a true horse.

Etymology
In older literature, the name achetta (for a mare, achettu for a stallion) is also sometimes encountered. It is no longer used because the Sardinian term it is derived from, acheta (variants: achetu, akkètta, akkéttu) describes any small to medium sized horse. The Sardinian term acheta itself is a diminutive based on the root ácha and entered the language via Catalan/Algherese (h)aca "small horse", itself from Spanish haca, jaca. The word jaca again is derived from Old Spanish haca, itself from Old French haque, which in turn is ultimately derived from the English place-name Hackney, a place famous for its horses.

The term Giara (variants: ghiaia, yára, ǧár(r)a) literally means "plateau, tableland", meaning the Giara di Gesturi, so literally "plateau horse".

Characteristics
It has a horse phenotype rather than that of a pony. Most are bay, chestnut or black. They have an abundant forelock and mane. Their head is relatively large with a wide jaw, the neck is not very long, but described as "strong." The breed tends to be a bit straight in the shoulder with relatively low withers, a somewhat long back and loin, and the croup is sloped with a low-set tail. The Giara has sure-footed gaits and a temperament that is spirited.

Habitat and population

The total population is estimated at around 700 individuals.

Present throughout Sardinia until Medieval times, the wild population now lives only in a restricted area of Southern Sardinia, on the large basalt plateau La Giara di Gesturi, at 500–600 meters above sea level. The Giara Plateau has sides that are steep cliffs, and the difficulty of access and the isolated location have protected the wild stock in recent centuries. Used in agriculture until the 1950s, the Giara horse was largely supplanted by machinery in the 1960s and many were slaughtered.

In 1971, considering the breed to be at risk of extinction, the Istituto di Incremento Ippico della Sardegna (Sardinian horse-breeding institution) of Ozieri established a breeding centre at Foresta Burgos, in central northern Sardinia. A small number of individuals were reintroduced elsewhere (Regional Park of Monte Arci and the Regional Park of Capo Caccia, in Alghero).

Today, some are used for farming and riding.  Recently the Istituto di Incremento Ippico has crossed Giara horses with Arabian horses to create the Giarab, a new breed suited to equestrian sports.

References

Salvatore Colomo, La fauna della Sardegna vol. 1, 2008, Nuoro, Ed. Archivio Fotografico Nuoro. 74-85.

External links
 The Civic Museum of the Giara Horse
 The Giara Horse
Nature documentary about the Giara horse
Brief documentary about the Giara horse
 List of Horses (including Giara) at Ozieri Remount Station

 

Horse breeds
Horse breeds originating in Italy
Fauna of Sardinia